is a railway station on the Myōkō Haneuma Line in Myōkō, Niigata, Japan, operated by the third-sector railway operator Echigo Tokimeki Railway.

Lines

Platforms

Adjacent stations

History
Sekiyama Station opened on 15 August 1886. With the privatization of JNR on 1 April 1987, the station came under the control of JR East.

From this date, Sekiyama Station was transferred to the ownership of the third-sector operating company Echigo Tokimeki Railway.

Passenger statistics
In fiscal 2017, the station was used by an average of 142 passengers daily (boarding passengers only).

Surrounding area
Seki Onsen
Sekiyama Post Office
Sekiyama Jinja

See also
 List of railway stations in Japan

References

External links
 Echigo Tokimeki Railway Station information 
 Timetable for Sekiyama Station 

Railway stations in Niigata Prefecture
Railway stations in Japan opened in 1886
Stations of Echigo Tokimeki Railway
Myōkō, Niigata